Streptomyces thermodiastaticus is a bacterium species from the genus of Streptomyces. Streptomyces thermodiastaticus produces a lytic enzyme against Candida albicans.

See also 
 List of Streptomyces species

References

Further reading

External links
Type strain of Streptomyces thermodiastaticus at BacDive -  the Bacterial Diversity Metadatabase

thermodiastaticus
Bacteria described in 1953